Bessie Marsh Brewer (1884–1952) was a Canadian-American printmaker, painter, sculptor and teacher. She studied at the New York School of Applied Design for Women and at the Art Students League with Robert Henri and  John Sloan. She illustrated for Century, Phoenix, Collier's, and St. Nicholas magazines.

She exhibited at the 1913 New York Armory Show where she showed three drawings, The Furnished Room, Curiosity and Putting Her Monday Name on Her Letterbox. Amongst the aforementioned skills, Bessie Marsh Brewer created in the styles of Realism, Representation, and Naturalism.

She was the mother of Sam Pope Brewer, New York Times correspondent whose wife later remarried to Kim Philby.

Awards
New York School of Applied Design for Women in commercial art (1922).

See also
List of artists in the Armory Show

References

1884 births
1952 deaths
Canadian printmakers
New York School of Applied Design for Women alumni
People from Old Toronto
Students of Robert Henri
Women printmakers
20th-century Canadian painters
20th-century Canadian sculptors
20th-century Canadian women artists
20th-century Canadian printmakers
Art Students League of New York alumni
Canadian emigrants to the United States